Historias breves ("Short Stories") is an Argentine feature-length film made up of nine short films directed, respectively, by Daniel Burman, Adrián Caetano, Jorge Gaggero, Tristán Gicovate, Andrés Tambornino and Ulises Rosell, Sandra Gugliotta, Lucrecia Martel, Pablo Ramos, and Bruno Stagnaro. It debuted in theaters on May 19, 1995.
	 
The film brings together the winners of the first edition of the Argentine National Film Board's (INCAA) annual public script competition, the grand prize of which is the budget to produce a short film. Eventually screened in national theaters, the omnibus film gave rise and recognition to a new generation of Argentine filmmakers known collectively as the New Argentine Cinema—a wave of contemporary filmmaking that began in the mid-1990s in reaction to decades of political and economic crises in the country.

Background

Filmmaker Lucrecia Martel explained in a 2008 interview that the premiere of the compilation film was “unprecedented” in Argentina and came about after all the directors of the short films banded together and visited the Argentine National Film Board (INCAA) headquarters in Buenos Aires repeatedly to ask the script contest organizers to premiere all the short films as a string of films in a theater. The filmmakers waited for hours until the contest organizers would meet with them and argued that it was a waste of state funding if they didn't exhibit the finished films. As a result, the films were exhibited on the dedicated screens of the national public circuit run by INCAA.

Short films included

La ausencia
La ausencia ("Absence"), written and directed by Pablo Ramos, is about a young man who tries to replace a lonely old watchmaker after discovering that he controls the lives of the people who pass by his street corner.

Cuesta abajo
Cuesta abajo ("Downhill"), written and directed by Adrián Caetano, is about a truck driver transporting a cargo of chickens, who becomes lost on an endless journey.

Dónde y cómo Oliveira perdió a Achala
Dónde y cómo Oliveira perdió a Achala ("Where and How Oliveira Lost Achala"), written and directed by Andrés Tambornino and Ulises Rosell and co-written by Rodrigo Moreno, is about two men traveling in a car looking for a village, apparently on the wrong road.

Guarisove, los olvidados
Guarisove, los olvidados ("Guarisove, the Forgotten Ones"), written and directed by Bruno Stagnaro, is about two groups of soldiers in the Falkland Islands who are unaware of the coming war.

Niños envueltos
Niños envueltos ("Wrapped Children" or "Stuffed Grape Leaves"), written and directed by Daniel Burman, is about a boy and girl who meet due to a confusion over home-delivery of meals.

Noches áticas
Noches áticas ("Attic Nights"), written and directed by Sandra Gugliotta, is about a tarot card reader who works on a phone sex hotline and receives a briefcase full of money with instructions to take it out of the country for laundering.

Ojos de fuego
Ojos de fuego ("Eyes of Fire"), directed by Jorge Gaggero and co-written with Matías Oks, a 13-year-old boy living in a miserable environment rebels and expresses himself with fire.

Rey muerto
Rey muerto ("Dead King"), written and directed by Lucrecia Martel and set in the fictional village of Rey Muerto in northeastern Argentina, is about a woman who tries to escape her abusive husband with their three children.

La simple razón
La simple razón ("The Simple Reason") is written and directed by Tristán Gicovate.

Critical reception

Film critic Claudio España of La Nación wrote:

Clarín wrote:

Film scholars Raúl Manrupe and María Alejandra Portela wrote:

El Amante del Cine magazine wrote:

Legacy
Filmmaker Lucrecia Martel says that the premiere of Historias breves was "very successful" and drew 10,000 viewers. "It also inspired people," she says, "to study filmmaking and to start making shorts. It was a really important phenomenon in spiritual terms. Curiously, many of the directors who began their careers at the time—’95 or ’96—are still making films today. That event inaugurated the activity of a lot of directors, and also a lot of young people’s interest in film." Film scholar Haden Guest says it helped inaugurate the New Argentine Cinema and “is really where the [movement] began.”

References

External links 
 

Argentine short films
1995 films
1995 short films
1990s Spanish-language films